Joshua or Josh Lee may refer to:

 Joshua Lee (New York politician) (1783–1842), United States Representative from New York
 Joshua B. Lee (1892–1967), United States Representative and Senator from Oklahoma
 Josh D Lee (born 1979), American lawyer